|}

The Christmas Hurdle is Grade 1 National Hunt hurdle race in Ireland. It is run at Leopardstown Racecourse in December, over a distance of 3 miles (4,828 metres) and during its running there are 12 flights of hurdles to be jumped.

The race is one of the feature races of Leopardstown's Christmas Festival. Prior to 2013 it carried Grade 2 status. The 2019 race was run as the Frank Ward Memorial Hurdle. The 2022 renewal was ran as the  Jack De Bromhead Christmas Hurdle.

Records
Most successful horse (3 wins):
 Apple's Jade – (2017, 2018, 2019)

Leading jockey (3 wins):
 Ruby Walsh –  Commanche Court (1998), Zaidpour (2013), Vroum Vroum Mag (2016

Leading trainer (4 wins):
 Gordon Elliott  – Prince of Scars (2015), Apple's Jade (2017, 2018, 2019)
 Willie Mullins - '' Mourad (2010), Zaidpour (2013), Vroum Vroum Mag (2016), Klassical Dream (2021)

Recent winners

See also
 Horse racing in Ireland
 List of Irish National Hunt races

References
Racing Post:

National Hunt races in Ireland
National Hunt hurdle races
Leopardstown Racecourse